Quiet Chaos is a 2008 Italian drama film based on the novel of the same name by Sandro Veronesi.

Plot 
Pietro Paladini and his brother Carlo, a fashion designer, rescue two women from drowning. At the same time Pietro's wife dies unexpectedly at home. After the funeral, Pietro falls into a state of Quiet Chaos, which is marked by spending a lot of time with his daughter Claudia. The manager is absent from his work and spends his days waiting in the park, which is opposite the school of his daughter. All the while, the widower stays very calm on the outside and is a focal point for his wife's sister Marta (Valeria Golino), his brother and co-workers who are affected by the merger of his group. It is the rebirth of a man who was once a tough manager.

Cast 

 Nanni Moretti: Pietro Paladini
 Valeria Golino: Marta Siciliano
 Isabella Ferrari: Eleonora Simoncini
 Hippolyte Girardot: Jean Claude
 Alessandro Gassman: Carlo Paladini
 Silvio Orlando: Samuele
 Blu Yoshimi: Claudia Paladini
 Antonella Attili: maestra Gloria
 Manuela Morabito: Maria Grazia
 Beatrice Bruschi: Benedetta
 Alba Rohrwacher: Annalisa
 Kasia Smutniak: Jolanda
 Roberto Nobile: Taramanni
 Sara D'Amario: Francesca
 Charles Berling: Boesson
 Roman Polanski: Steiner
 Denis Podalydes: Thierry
 Babak Karimi: Mario
 Stefano Guglielmi: Matteo
 Tatiana Lepore: Mamma Matteo
 Cloris Brosca: Psicoterapeuta
 Valentina Gaia: Ragazza Conferenza
 Valentina Carnelutti: Mamma 1
 Anna Gigante: Mamma 2
 Nestor Saied: Marito Simoncini
 Roberta Bruni(actress)|Roberta Bruni: Insegnante Gimnastica
 Ugo De Cesare: Ragazzo Cena Gala
 Dina Braschi: Dona Anziana Cena Gala
 Claudia Alfonso: Ragazza Cena Gala
 Cinzia Bernardini: Altra Donna Cena Gala
 Lamberto Antinori: Uomo Cena Gala
 Ester Cavallari: Lara
 Il Cane Riccardo: Nebbia
 La Scimmia Di Peluche: Pupa

Reception
Stanley Kauffmann of The New Republic called Quiet Chaos "thoughtful and rich."

References

External links 
 

2008 films
2000s Italian-language films
2008 drama films
Films directed by Antonello Grimaldi
Italian drama films
Films based on Italian novels
Films based on works by Sandro Veronesi
2000s Italian films
Fandango (Italian company) films